A Girl Receiving a Letter is a  painting by Dutch artist Gabriël Metsu. The artwork is part of the collection of San Diego's Timken Museum of Art, in California.

Description
It depicts a woman, seated in a arcade, with a book on her lap, who receives a letter, delivered by a boy, presumed addressed to her by a love interest. A vase with some flowers stands in front of her, most likely as a symbolic reference. The arcade shows a Palladian villa. This painting is believed to be a complement to another, depicting a man writing a letter, now held in the Musée Condé, in Chantilly.

See also

 1658 in art

References

External links
 

1658 paintings
Paintings by Gabriël Metsu
Paintings in the collection of the Timken Museum of Art
Portraits of women